Charlotte Froese Fischer (born 1929) is a Canadian-American applied mathematician and computer scientist noted for the development and implementation of the Multi-Configurational Hartree–Fock (MCHF) approach to atomic-structure calculations and its application to the description of atomic structure and spectra.

The experimental discovery of the negative ion of calcium
 
was motivated by her theoretical prediction of its existence.
This was the first known anion of a Group 2 element. 
Its discovery was cited in Froese Fischer's election to Fellow of the American Physical Society.

Early life
Charlotte Froese was born on September 21, 1929, in the village of Stara Mykolaivka (formerly Pravdivka, and Nikolayevka), in the  Donetsk region, in the present-day Ukraine, to parents of Mennonite descent. Her parents immigrated to Germany in 1929 on the last train allowed to cross the border before its closure by Soviet authorities. After a few months in a refugee camp, her family was allowed to immigrate to Canada, where they eventually established themselves in Chilliwack, British Columbia.

Education and research
She obtained both a B.A. degree, with honors, in Mathematics and Chemistry and an M.A. degree in Applied Mathematics from the University of British Columbia in 1952 and 1954, respectively. She then obtained her Ph.D. in Applied Mathematics and Computing at Cambridge University in 1957, pursuing coursework in quantum theory with Paul Dirac. She worked under the supervision of Douglas Hartree, whom she assisted in programming the Electronic Delay Storage Automatic Calculator (EDSAC) for atomic-structure calculations.

She served on the mathematics faculty of the University of British Columbia from 1957 till 1968, where she introduced numerical analysis and computer courses into the curriculum and was instrumental in the formation of the Computer Science Department.Froese Fischer spent 1963-64 at the Harvard College Observatory, where she extended her research on atomic-structure calculations. While at Harvard, she was the first woman scientist to be awarded an Alfred P. Sloan Fellowship. In 1991 she became a Fellow of the American Physical Society, in part for her contribution to the discovery of negative calcium. In 1995 she was elected a member of the Royal Physiographic Society in Lund, in 2004 a foreign member of the Lithuanian Academy of Sciences, and in 2015 she was awarded an Honorary Doctorate in Technology from Malmö University, Sweden.

Contributions
Froese Fischer is the author of over 300 research articles on computational atomic theory, many of which have had far-reaching impact in the area of atomic-structure calculations. The early version of the MCHF program, published in the first volume of Computer Physics Communications received two  Citation Classics Awards in 1987. She authored an influential monograph on Hartree-Fock approaches to the first-principles calculation of atomic structure, 
and coauthored a substantial successor work.    
One of her largest efforts in the field is the calculation of the complete lower spectra of the beryllium-like to argon-like isoelectronic sequences, amounting to the publication of data covering 400 journal pages and a total of over 150 ions.

 She also authored a scientific biography of her Ph.D. thesis advisor, Douglas Hartree.

Froese Fischer is currently an emerita research professor of computer science at Vanderbilt University and a Guest Scientist in the Atomic Spectroscopy Group at NIST. She is the widow of Patrick C. Fischer, himself a noted computer scientist and former professor at Vanderbilt. An autobiographical account of her own life up to the year 2000 was published in Molecular Physics,
and a biographical review of her scientific work up to 2019 has been published in Atoms.

References

External links
Personal web page, includes all her scientific work: results, publications, software, etc...
Reminiscences at the end of the century: Biography of herself and a short biography of Douglas Hartree
Page of Charlotte Froese Fischer on the NIST website

1929 births
Living people
Canadian women mathematicians
Fellows of the American Physical Society
Members of the Royal Physiographic Society in Lund
Canadian women computer scientists
Canadian computer scientists
Canadian women physicists
Canadian women chemists
Canadian Mennonites
20th-century American women scientists
Theoretical chemists
Academics in British Columbia
University of British Columbia Faculty of Science alumni
Academic staff of the University of British Columbia Faculty of Science
Harvard University faculty
Vanderbilt University faculty
Canadian expatriate academics in the United States
Place of birth missing (living people)
Computational chemists
Sloan Research Fellows
People from Chilliwack
Harvard College Observatory people
American women academics
20th-century Canadian women scientists